Annalisa Scarrone (born 5 August 1985) better known as simply Annalisa or Nali, is an Italian singer-songwriter, Record producer and TV personality. After being part of two bands, Elaphe Guttata and leNoire (Ex Malvasia), she became famous after participating in the tenth edition of the talent show Amici di Maria De Filippi in 2010–2011, where she finished in second place. Subsequently, Annalisa participated in the Festival of Sanremo 2013 with the song "Scintille" and finished ninth.

Annalisa participated at the Sanremo Music Festival 2015 with the song "Una finestra tra le stelle" and finished fourth. In 2016, she returned to the Sanremo Music Festival with the single "Il diluvio universale" finishing eleventh, and again in the 2018 edition with "Il mondo prima di te", finishing third, and most recently she finished seventh with "Dieci" in Sanremo 2021. She received several awards, including a MTV Europe Music Award, a Wind Music Award and a Lutezia Award for her songwriting, and nominations at the Kid's Choice Award and World Music Awards.

She has recorded 7 albums and 29 singles as a solo artist, receiving 10 platinum and 8 gold certifications and selling over 1 million copies. She has also written songs for other artists including Gianna Nannini, Fedez, Benji & Fede and collaborated with Boomdabash, J-Ax, Antonello Venditti, Gianluca Grignani, Marcella Bella and Nomadi.

From 2015 to 2019, she presented the documentary series Tutta colpa di ... on Italia 1, focusing on the scientists Albert Einstein, Galileo Galilei, Charles Darwin and Leonardo da Vinci.

Early life 
She grew up in Carcare and studied music and singing from an early age. From the age of 13, she worked as a bartender and musician. In 2009 she graduated from the University of Turin in Physics.

Music career

2011-2013: Nali, Mentre tutto cambia and Non so ballare 

In 2011 Annalisa took part at the 10th edition of the Italian talent show Amici di Maria De Filippi where she finished second and also received the critics' prize. In March 2011 her first album Nali was released; it reached number 2 in the official Italian album chart by FIMI and was certified platinum. Her first single "Diamante lei e luce lui", that reached the ninth position in the official Italian single chart in 2012, was certified gold. In addition this single won the Premio Videoclip Italiano 2011. Her second single "Giorno per giorno" was released on 27 May 2011.

"Senza riserva", from the second album Mentre tutto cambia, was released on 16 March 2012 and later certified platinum. The second single of her second album was "Tra due minuti è primavera". The last single from Mentre tutto cambia was "Per una notte o per sempre". At the end of the same year Annalisa sang "Pirati", which featured in the Italian version of the film Ice Age: Continental Drift.

In 2013, she participated at the Sanremo Music Festival and finished ninth, with the single "Scintille". At the same time, her third album Non so ballare was released and reached the sixth position in the official Italian album chart. Also during 2013, Annalisa represented Italy at the OGAE Song Contest with the song "Alice e il blu", the second single from the album Non so ballare, and finished third. At the same time, she had two nominations for Best Female Artist and Best Video with the song "Alice e il blu" at World Music Awards. She subsequently represented Italy at the International Song Contest: The Global Sound with "Scintille", and in November won the competition. The third single from Non so ballare was "A modo mio amo" and its videoclip was a collage of the previous ones.

In December 2013 Roberto Casalino, the author of many Annalisa's songs, announced that "Tutto sommato" from the second studio album Mentre tutto cambia, featured on the soundtrack of the Dutch film Toscaanse Bruiloft. In January 2014 the album was released in the Netherlands and "Tutto sommato" featured as a single. For these reasons, in January 2014 the singer was sent for the first time abroad to promote the film and her first album published abroad. The film also contains the two bonus tracks of the digital version of the Dutch iTunes album, the song "Non so ballare" and the unreleased song, "Capirai".

2014-2016: Splende and Se avessi un cuore 

On 1 April 2014, Annalisa made a guest appearance on Incredibile, the new studio album of Moreno, featuring on the song "Ferire per amare". On 14 April 2014, it was announced that the single "Sento solo il presente" would anticipate the release of her fourth studio album. The song was released in Italy on 5 May 2014. It reached, the seventh position in the official Italian single chart.

In May 2014, she co-wrote "Siamo amore" for the competitor of the thirteenth edition of the talent show Amici, Giada Agasucci. She and Marco Ciappelli wrote the lyrics of the song, while the music was written by Francesco Sighieri and Diego Calvetti. "Siamo amore" was added to Giada album called Da capo and was released as a single on 20 June 2014. 

In September 2014 she released the single "L'ultimo addio". The text of the song was written by Annalisa and Marco Ciappelli, while the music was written by Francesco Sighieri. Annalisa collaborated with Italian rapper Raige, on the single "Dimenticare", released on 9 December 2014.

On 14 December 2014, the singer was announced as a competitor of Sanremo Music Festival 2015 with the song "Una finestra tra le stelle" and finished fourth. Along with the songs "Sento solo il presente" and "L'ultimo addio", "Una finestra tra le stelle" anticipated the release of the fourth album. On 23 January 2015, through the official page of Facebook of the singer, is also announced the title of the new album, Splende, available from 12 February. Annalisa also announced the first two dates of her Splende tour, on 1 April, at the Teatro Nuovo of Milan and 3 to Auditorium Parco della Musica of Rome, with pre-sales open from 26 January. On 8 May 2015, "Una finestra tra le stelle" was certified platinum for sales exceeding 50,000 copies.

The fourth single from Splende, "Vincerò", was published on 15 May 2015 and on 7 September 2015 was certified gold for sales over 25,000 copies. On 12 September 2015, Annalisa announced the release of the album's fifth single, via her official Facebook page. Following a countdown game, with images for clues, on 14 September the singer announced that the next single would be the title track, "Splende". The single was released on 18 September 2015.

Annalisa participated at the Sanremo Musical Festival 2016 with the single "Il diluvio universale", finishing eleventh. The song anticipated her fifth album, Se avessi un cuore, which debuted at number four on the Italian Album Chart. On 15 April 2016, the singer released the second single from the album, "Se avessi un cuore", which was later certified gold by FIMI.

2017-2021: Bye Bye and Nuda 
On 30 August 2017, Annalisa revealed she was working on her next studio album and on 13 October, the first single, "Direzione la vita", was released. On 16 February 2018, she released the studio album Bye Bye. The album peaked at number two of FIMI's chart, receiving being certified platinum . Annalisa took part at the Sanremo Music Festival for the fourth time in 2018 and finished third, with the song "Il mondo prima di te" (English: The world before you). The song became her highest peaking single as a solo artist in the Italian chart, reaching number three. Throughout 2018, she released a further two singles from the album: "Bye Bye" and "Un domani" with Italian rapper Mr.Rain, both certified platinum with over 50,000 copies sold.

On 29 November 2019, Annalisa released the single "Vento sulla luna", featuring vocals by Italian rapper Rkomi. On 13 April 2020, she released "Houseparty", the second single of her upcoming seventh studio album. In 2020, Annalisa collaborated with J-Ax for "Supercalifragili", as the third single from rapper's album Reale, and with Achille Lauro in "Sweet Dreams".

In September 2020, the singer released her seventh studio album Nuda, with the third single "Tsunami". The singer participated at the Sanremo Music Festival 2021, with the single "Dieci", which was certified double platinum with over 140,000 copies sold. On 28 May 2021 "Movimento lento" was published as the second single from the re-issue of her seventh studio album Nuda10. The song peaked at number 8 on the FIMI Singles Chart and was certified double platinum in Italy.

2022: Upcoming eighth studio album 
On 10 June 2022, Annalisa was featured on Boomdabash's single "Tropicana", which peaked at number 3 on the FIMI Singles Chart, becoming her tenth song to reach the top ten of the chart. The song also reached number 1 on the Italian airplay chart, and was certified platinum in Italy for sales exceeding 100,000 copies.

On 26 August 2022, Annalisa announced through an interview with Vanity Fair Italia that her new single "Bellissima" would be released on 2 September 2022, before receiving its live debut at the Verona Arena on 7 September. The song was written in August 2021 and Annalisa described it as her "first step into a new world", with its message of dancing to let go of paranoia and disappointment being the "perfect musical representation of her as a person". Musically, the song draws on a range of influences from Patty Pravo and Mina to Nada and Dua Lipa.

Discography 

 Nali (2011)
 Mentre tutto cambia (2012)
 Non so ballare (2013)
 Splende (2015)
 Se avessi un cuore (2016)
 Bye Bye (2018)
 Nuda (2020)

Tour 
2012
 Mentre tutto cambia Tour
2013
 Non so ballare Tour
2015
 Splende Tour
2016
 Se avessi un cuore Tour
2018Bye Bye live2021Nuda10 Open AirFilmography

 Awards 
Won
2011
 Premio della Critica giornalistica at Amici di Maria De Filippi Premio Cd Platino at Wind Music Awards for Nali Premio Emergenti at Premio Videoclip Italiano for Diamante lei e luce lui2012
 Premio della Critica giornalistica (Category Big) at Amici di Maria De Filippi Menzione Speciale per il valore Musical-Letterario for Mentre tutto cambia at Premio Lunezia
 Premio Donne at Premio Videoclip Italiano for Senza riserva2013
 Premio Perla Del Tirreno
 International Song Contest: The Global Sound with Scintille Best Song at Velvet Awards with Alice e il blu2014
 Best Summer Song at Velvet Awards with Sento solo il presente2015
 Your-O-Vision Song Contest with Vincerò2018
 OGAE Second chance Contest with Il mondo prima di te
 Mtv Music EMA 2018 Bilbao like Best Italian actNomination
2012
 Rockol Awards like Miglior singolo italiano with Senza riserva Rockol Awards like Miglior video italiano with Senza riserva2013
 OGAE Song Contest 2013 with Alice e il blu 
 World Music Awards like Best Female Artist World Music Awards like Best Video with Alice e il blu Velvet Awards like Best Live2014
 RTL 102.5 like Canzone dell'estate 2014 with Sento solo il presente Latin Music Italian Awards like Best International Female Artist Or Group of the Year Latin Music Italian Awards like Best International Female Video of the Year with Sento solo il presente2015
 Rembrandt Awards like Best Movie Hit Song with Tutto Sommato Nickelodeon Kids' Choice Awards like Best Italian Singer Italian MTV Music Awards like Artist Saga Italian MTV Music Awards like MTV Awards Star Italian MTV Music Awards like Best Performance Live Latin Music Italian Awards like Best International Female Artist Or Group of the Year Latin Music Italian Awards like Best International Female Video of the Year with Una finestra tra le stelle''

References 

1985 births
Living people
Italian pop singers
Italian singer-songwriters
People from the Province of Savona
21st-century Italian singers
21st-century Italian women singers